Millers Bluff is a rural locality in the local government areas (LGA) of Central Highlands and Northern Midlands in the Central LGA region of Tasmania. The 2016 census recorded a population of nil for the state suburb of Millers Bluff.

History 
Millers Bluff is a confirmed locality.

Geography
The Lake River forms a small part of the eastern boundary. Almost all the boundaries are survey lines.

Road infrastructure 
Route C522 (Macquarie Road) passes to the north-east. From there, Lake River Road provides access to the locality.

References

Towns in Tasmania
Localities of Central Highlands Council
Localities of Northern Midlands Council